Kynan Lerrol Forney (born September 8, 1978) is a former American football player.  He was drafted by the Atlanta Falcons in the seventh round of the 2001 NFL Draft. He played college football at Hawaii. He also played for the San Diego Chargers.

College career
Forney transferred to the University of Hawaii from Trinity Valley Community College in 1998. In 1997 won the JUCO National Championship at Trinity Valley Community College going 12-0 and was a 1st team all conference selection. .  As a senior, Forney earned unanimous 1st team All-Western Athletic Conference honors. He started 11 games at right tackle, collecting 94 knockdown blocks, as the unit allowed only 10 sacks on the season. As a junior, Forney appeared in every game and made five starts. Was selected to play in the Senior Bowl All Star Game in Mobile, Alabama following his senior season at Hawaii. In 2012 was selected to the TVCC Cardinal Hall of Fame. No. 65 on the Honolulu Star Bulletins list of University of Hawaii All Time Greats.

Professional career

Atlanta Falcons
Forney was drafted in the latter part of the seventh round of the 2001 NFL Draft by the Atlanta Falcons. Forney immediately made his way into the lineup, starting 8 of 12 games while missing four games due to a nagging toe injury suffered in the season opener. Forney started 68 of 80 career games with the Falcons and was a key part of an offensive line responsible for the NFL's top rushing attack in 2004 and 2005. In 2004 Forney was a 4th Alternate to the Pro Bowl and an ESPN All Pro Selection. In 2005, Forney was named as a Pro Bowl first-alternate. During the 2004 postseason, Forney was part of a line that set the fourth-highest NFL postseason record with 327 rushing yards, including a Falcons record 142 yards by Warrick Dunn and an NFL record for quarterbacks with Michael Vick collecting 119 yards on the ground.[1] Over his time in Atlanta, Forney made two playoff appearances and helped the Falcons win their first division title (2004) since 1998 including reaching the NFC Championship Game in 2004. Bleacher Reports Atlanta Falcons All Decade Team.

On August 29, 2008 the Falcons released Forney during final cuts.

San Diego Chargers
Two days after his release from the Falcons, Forney agreed to terms on a one-year contract with the San Diego Chargers on September 1, 2008. He remained with the team the entire season but did not appear in a game.

Scheduled to be an unrestricted free agent in the 2009 offseason, Forney was re-signed to a two-year, $4.8 million contract on February 25. However, he was released during final cuts on September 5.

Jacksonville Jaguars
Forney was signed by the Jacksonville Jaguars on September 8, 2009, with the team releasing offensive lineman Dennis Norman to make room on the roster.
Forney was subsequently released by the Jaguars.  He officially retired in 2010.

References

4.

https://bleacherreport.com/articles/279807-atlanta-falcons-all-decade-team

External links
Jacksonville Jaguars bio
San Diego Chargers bio

1978 births
Living people
People from Nacogdoches, Texas
Players of American football from Texas
American football offensive tackles
American football offensive guards
Trinity Valley Cardinals football players
Hawaii Rainbow Warriors football players
Atlanta Falcons players
San Diego Chargers players
Jacksonville Jaguars players